DYME (783 AM) Radyo Masbate is a radio station owned and operated by Masbate Community Broadcasting Company. Its studios & transmitter are located at DYME Bldg., Zurbito St., Brgy. Pating, Masbate City.

References

News and talk radio stations in the Philippines
Radio stations established in 1979